Lohn may refer to:

 Leber's hereditary optic neuropathy or LOHN
 Landsitz Lohn, the country estate of the Swiss Federal Council
 Lohn, Texas
 Lohn Independent School District, located in Lohn, Texas
 a number of municipalities in Switzerland:
 Lohn, Graubünden
 Lohn, Schaffhausen
 Lohn, Solothurn, a former municipality now part of Lohn-Ammannsegg